Sargassum polyphyllum is a species of brown (class Phaeophyceae) macroalgae or limu (seaweed) in the order Fucales.

References

Fucales
Taxa named by Jacob Georg Agardh